Jacques Bellanger (25 June 1931 – 30 September 2021) was a French politician. A member of the Socialist Party, he served in the Senate from 1986 to 1995 and again from 1997 to 2004.

References

1931 births
2021 deaths
Politicians from Île-de-France
21st-century French politicians
20th-century French politicians
Socialist Party (France) politicians
Senators of Yvelines
People from Fontainebleau
French Senators of the Fifth Republic